= Mianghundi =

Village in Balochistan, Pakistan

- Location in Pakistan
- Coordinates: 30°3′57″N 66°57′16″E4

Mianghundi (mian midst, ghundi refers to mountains) is a small village in Balochistan, Pakistan. It is surrounded by mountains, southwest of Quetta. It is well known for its bowl-like structure and prehistoric status, as it was supposed to be a cantt of the government of Pakistan.

Mianghundi lies adjacent to the Koh-i-chiltan Koh-i-Apurs Koh-i-Murdar and to the low mountains.

Chiltan national park lies to the west and Mianghundi national park lies to the north near the Quetta fruit market.

== Geography ==
Mianghundi (Miān Ghundi) is a hill (class T - Hypsographic). A Hill is a rounded elevation of limited extent rising above the surrounding land with local relief of less than 300m.

Its UTM position is UU02 and its Joint Operation Graphics reference is NH42-05. The standard time zone for Mianghundi is UTC/GMT+5.
